Libonati is an Italian surname. Notable people with the surname include:

Berardino Libonati (1934–2010), Italian academic, businessman, jurist, and lawyer
Roland V. Libonati (1900–1991), American politician

See also
Libonatti

Italian-language surnames